The 2016/2017 season was the 25th season of The Belarusian Men's Handball Championship.

First stage

Teams were divided into 2 groups:

 Group 1: SKA Minsk, GK Gomel, Kronon Grodno, Masheka Mogilev, Meshkov Brest 2
 Group 2: RCOR-2000, SKA-RGUOR, GK Gomel 2, Kronon Grodno 2, Vityaz-BSEU Minsk

Results

Group 1

∗ Meshkov Brest 2 has better goal difference in matches against Masheka Mogilev and therefore stands above

Group 2

∗ SKA-RGUOR has better goal difference in matches against Vityaz-BSEU Minsk and therefore stands above

Second stage (Playoffs)

According to the final positions in Group 1 were formed playoffs pairs up as follows:

 5th place - 2nd place
 4th place - 3rd place

Winners of the playoffs pairs played at the third stage in the Group A, defeated teams - in the Group B. The playoffs were held up to two wins one of the teams.

Results

Third stage

According to the results of the previous stages were formed 3 groups:

 Group A: HC Meshkov Brest, 1st place of Group 1 and winners of playoffs pairs
 Group B: defeated in playoffs and 2 best teams of Group 2
 Group C: rest teams of Group 2

At the end of the stage in Group B were determined the places from 5th to 8th in the championship, in the Group C – the places from 9th to 11th in the championship.

Results

Group A

Group B

∗ SKA-RGUOR got a technical defeat (0:10) in 2 matches (against Masheka Mogilev and Vityaz-BSEU Minsk) for participation of player, which didn't have right for this

Group C

Fourth stage (Playoffs)

According to the final positions in Group A were formed semi-final pairs up as follows:

 3rd place - 2nd place
 4th place - 1st place

Winners of the semi-final pairs played in the final round, where competed for the gold and silver medals of the championship. Defeated in semi-finals teams competed for the bronze medals. The semi-finals were held up to two wins one of the teams, the final round - up to three wins.

Results

Semi-finals

Third place

Final

Results of the season

References

Belarus
2016 in Belarusian sport
2017 in Belarusian sport
Handball in Belarus
Sports competitions in Belarus